Seashores of Old Mexico is a studio album by Merle Haggard and Willie Nelson. It is a sequel to their enormously successful 1983 duet album Pancho and Lefty and was released in 1987. They are backed by The Strangers.  The only charting single was a cover of a 1979 Blaze Foley song, "If I Could Only Fly", which peaked at number 58 on the 1987 Billboard Hot Country Songs singles chart.

Background
Haggard and Nelson, who would each be plagued with financial problems in the years ahead, chose to produce the album themselves. However, it did not contain a hit single like their previous duet album had and peaked on the Billboard country albums chart at number 31. The album is dominated with songs composed by Haggard, although Nelson does contribute "Why Do I Have to Choose." Two remakes are included: the title track, which Haggard had written and recorded in 1974, and Haggard's 1969 ballad "Silver Wings." Perhaps the biggest surprise on the album is the inclusion of the Beatles classic ballad "Yesterday", a song that Nelson had performed regularly in concert in the sixties but Haggard had cited as a marker of the end of the good ol' days on his 1982 hit "Are the Good Times Really Over (I Wish a Buck Was Still Silver)."

Critical reception
Martin Monkman of AllMusic believes the album pales in comparison to its predecessor, writing, "Alas, little of what made the earlier album so great is in evidence. At times the album sounds like a Merle Haggard record with Willie Nelson on hand as support." In his 2013 book The Running Kind, Haggard biographer David Cantwell is especially critical of Haggard's singing on "Yesterday": "His rich baritone, in especially fine form on Seashores' every other track, feels like it's been unexpectedly pumped with air and left out overnight in the chill and damp. His phrases, which normally snap off crisply or, more often, fade slowly like a sunset, here merely crumple."

Track listing
"Seashores of Old Mexico" (Merle Haggard)
"Without You on My Side" (Haggard)
"When Times Were Good" (David Lynn Jones)
"Jimmy the Broom" (Haggard, Freddy Powers)
"Yesterday" (John Lennon, Paul McCartney)
"If I Could On'y Fly" (Blaze Foley)
"Shotgun and a Pistol" (Haggard)
"Love Makes a Fool of Us All" (Glenn Martin, Hank Cochran)
"Why Do I Have to Choose" (Willie Nelson)
"Silver Wings" (Haggard)

Personnel
Merle Haggard– vocals, guitar, fiddle
Willie Nelson – vocals, guitar

The Strangers:
Roy Nichols – guitar
Norm Hamlet – steel guitar
Clint Strong – guitar
Mark Yeary – piano
Dennis Hromek – bass
Biff Adams – drums
Jimmy Belken – fiddle
Gary Church – trumpet
Don Markham – saxophone

with:
Johnny Gimble – fiddle

and:
Spencer Starnes – bass
Dean Reynolds – upright bass
Donna Faye – backing vocals

References

1987 albums
Collaborative albums
Merle Haggard albums
Willie Nelson albums
Sequel albums
Epic Records albums